Alderslade v Hendon Laundry Ltd [1945] KB 189 is an English contract law case, concerning the construction of exemption clauses, and the ''contra proferentem principle.

Facts
Ten large handkerchiefs were lost by the laundry. It argued that its liability was limited by a clause in the contract which read: ‘The maximum amount allowed for lost or damaged articles is twenty times the charge made for laundering.’ That was 11s 5d, about one tenth of the cost of the handkerchiefs at £5.

The judge held that the claim succeeded, and Hendon Laundry Ltd appealed.

Judgment
The Court of Appeal of England and Wales held the limitation clause did apply, because although negligence was not mentioned, the defendants could only have been liable for the handkerchiefs if they had been negligent. A common carrier, for example, must make clear that negligence is excluded, and if that is not done in clear terms, only liability for a strict duty will be excluded. But here, the only other duty was the absolute, primary obligation to perform the contract itself.

Lord Greene MR said the following.

See also

English contract law

Notes

References

English contract case law
Court of Appeal (England and Wales) cases
1945 in British law
1945 in case law